Martin Záhorovský (born February 9, 1981 in Havířov) is a Czech professional ice hockey player. He played with HC Zlín in the Czech Extraliga during the 2010–11 Czech Extraliga season.

References

External links

1981 births
Czech ice hockey forwards
PSG Berani Zlín players
Living people
People from Havířov
Sportspeople from the Moravian-Silesian Region
Stadion Hradec Králové players
HKM Zvolen players
Czech expatriate ice hockey players in Slovakia